Waiting for the Miracle to Come is a 2018 fantasy drama film written and directed by Lian Lunson, and stars Sophie Lowe, Charlotte Rampling, and Willie Nelson.

Cast
 Sophie Lowe as Adeline Winter
 Charlotte Rampling as Dixie Riggs
 Willie Nelson as Jimmy Riggs
 Waylon Payne as Shooter Jones
 Todd Terry as Jack Winter
 Erwin Raphael McManus as Father Carlos Romero
 Sile Bermingham as Betty Winter

Production

Filming
Filming took place at various locations in the Austin, Texas area and a preserved film set on Nelson's ranch in Spicewood, Texas.

Soundtrack
Bono of U2 wrote a song for the film titled "Where the Shadows Fall," with Nelson performing the vocals.

Reception
Joe Leydon of Variety praised Rampling and Nelson's chemistry together and acting, and said, "... it’s entirely possible that many impatient viewers will give up on “Waiting for the Miracle to Come” after the first 20 minutes or so. It is equally possible, however, that Lunson will get you on her wavelength, and you’ll be sufficiently enthralled to complete the journey with her." Barbara Shulgasser of Common Sense Media gave the film 2/5 stars, and called it an, "Offbeat, but mundane drama...," criticizing the plot structure and character development, but praised Rampling's performance.
Sam K. of Dove.org said, "Sometimes the film is confusing or frustrating...," but called it, "a truly unique experience."

References

External links
 

2018 films
American fantasy drama films
Films directed by Lian Lunson
Films shot in Austin, Texas
2010s fantasy drama films
2018 drama films
2010s English-language films
2010s American films